Domme may refer to:

 Domme, Dordogne, commune of the Dordogne département, in southwestern France
 Dominatrix female